Labellorrhina is a genus of long-beaked fungus gnats in the family Lygistorrhinidae.

Species
L. grimaldii Hippa, Mattsson & Vilkamaa, 2005
L. quantula Hippa, Mattsson & Vilkamaa, 2005

References

Sciaroidea genera